The Voice Kids is a Polish reality talent show that premiered on January 1, 2018 on the TVP 2 television network. The Voice Kids is part of the international syndication The Voice based on the reality singing competition launched in the Netherlands as The Voice Kids, created by Dutch television producer John de Mol. The coaches are Tomson & Baron, Edyta Górniak and Dawid Kwiatkowski. The season was won by then 13-year-old Roksana Węgiel from Jasło. This marked Edyta Górniak's first and only win as a coach.

Coaches

Teams 
 Colour key

Blind auditions 
Color key

Episode 1 (1 January) 
The coaches performed "Wake Up" at the start of the show.

Episode 2 (1 January)

Episode 3 (6 January)

Episode 4 (6 January)

Episode 5 (13 January)

Episode 6 (13 January)

Episode 7 (20 January)

Episode 8 (20 January)

Episode 9 (27 January)

Episode 10 (27 January)

The Battle Rounds 
Color key

Episode 11: Team Tomson & Baron (3 February)
The Tomson & Baron's group performed "Krąg Życia" at the start of the show.

Sing offs

Episode 12: Team Edyta Górniak (10 February)
The Edyta's group performed "Earth Song" at the start of the show.

Sing offs

Episode 13: Team Dawid Kwiatkowski (17 February)
The Dawid's group performed "Nie mów nie" at the start of the show.

Sing offs

Episode 14 Finale (24 February) 
Color key

Round 1
The Final 9 and coaches performed "Wake Up" at the start of the show.

Round 2
Each contestant performed a cover song and their original song.

Elimination chart
Artist's info

Result details

Teams
Color key
Artist's info

Results details

Ratings

References

Kids series 1
2018 Polish television seasons